Die Laughing may refer to:
 Death from laughter
 Die Laughing (album), a stand-up comedy album by Doug Stanhope
 Die Laughing (band), a British goth band
 Die Laughing (film), a 1980 American film
 "Die Laughing" (song), a song by Therapy?
 Die Laughing, a 1998 Batman/Judge Dredd crossover